The 2022–23 Liga III will be the 67th season of Liga III, the third tier of the Romanian football league system. The season will begin in August 2022 and is scheduled to end in June 2023.

This season is the third consecutive with a format that will include 100 teams (10x10). The format was changed two seasons ago, due to the financial problems generated by the COVID-19 pandemic. The difference this season is that a play-off and play-out was introduced between the regular season and the promotion play-offs.



Team changes

Teams excluded by Romanian Football Federation
Academica Clinceni and Gaz Metan Mediaş relegated to Liga II at the end of the 2021–22 Liga I season. On 20 June 2022, Academica and on 27 June 2022, Gaz Metan was relegated directly to Liga III, by the Romanian Football Federation, which denied a second tier licence to Academica and Gaz Metan, due to important financial problems and unpaid debts to current and former players and managers.

Academica Clinceni II, the second team of Academica Clinceni, which was a Liga III member, was automatically relegated to Liga IV, as an indirect result of the first team relegation to the third tier.

On 8 August 2022, Academica Clinceni and Gaz Metan Mediaş were both excluded from all the competitions organized by the Romanian Football Federation, due to financial problems.

Withdrawn teams
Rapid II București, Hușana Huși, Speranța Răucești and Silvicultorul Maieru withdrew from the competition, before de start of the season.

Teams spared from relegation
Politehnica Timișoara and Unirea Constanța was spared from relegation to 2022–23 Liga III season, due to the decision to relegate Academica Clinceni and Gaz Metan Mediaş, decision that vacanted places in the 2022–23 Liga II season.

Aurul Brad was spared from relegation to 2022–23 Liga IV season, due to the decision to relegate Academica II Clinceni, decision that vacanted a place in the 2022–23 Liga III season.

CSM Bacău, Unirea Alba Iulia, Progresul Ezeriș, Flacăra Horezu, Kids Tâmpa Brașov and Minerul Costești were spared from relegation to 2022–23 Liga IV season, due to the exclusion of Academica Clinceni and Gaz Metan Mediaş and the withdrawn of Rapid II București, Hușana Huși, Speranța Răucești and Silvicultorul Maieru.

Other changes
Club Atletic Oradea enrolled in the 2022–23 Liga IV as the result of the broke up between the former associate members, the private part (owner of the Club Atletic Oradea and CAO-NAC brands) and the public part. The public part made a new entity (FC Bihor Oradea), that took the Liga III place, vacanted by Club Atletic Oradea.

CS Hunedoara officially bought FC Corvinul Hunedoara brand and was renamed as Corvinul Hunedoara. Due to merge between CS Hunedoara and the FC Corvinul brand, CS Hunedoara became the official successor of FC Corvinul.

Dunărea Turris Turnu Măgurele was renamed as Cetatea Turnu Măgurele.

CS Rucăr was moved from Rucăr to Câmpulung and was renamed as Muscelul Câmpulung Elite.

League map

Regular season

Seria I

Seria II

Seria III

Seria IV

Seria V

Seria VI

Seria VII

Seria VIII

Seria IX

Seria X

References

2022
3
Romania